X-79 is a  sailboat class designed by Niels Jeppesen and built in about 500 copies.

History
Niels Jeppesen designed the X-79 to compete in the Sjælland Rundt.

See also
 X-99

Links 
 X-79 resource site

References

1970s sailboat type designs
Sailboat type designs by Niels Jeppesen
Keelboats
Sailboat types built by x yachts